Erythrina speciosa is a tree native to Brazil, which is often cultivated and has introduced populations in Africa and India.  It is pollinated by hummingbirds.

References

External links 
 Desert Tropicals

speciosa
Taxa named by Henry Cranke Andrews